The 1896 Tennessee gubernatorial election was held on November 3, 1896. Democratic nominee Robert Love Taylor defeated Republican nominee G. N. Tillman with 48.75% of the vote.

General election

Candidates
Major party candidates
Robert Love Taylor, Democratic
G. N. Tillman, Republican

Other candidates
A. L. Mims, People's
Josephus Hopwood, Prohibition

Results

References

1896
Tennessee
Gubernatorial